Sufia Khatun (known as Kangalini Sufia; born 01 January 1961) is a Bangladeshi folk singer. Her real name is "Anita Halder". She performed as a playback singer for the films Darodi Shatru, Agun and Raj Shinghashon.

Early life
Sufia was born in 1948/49 in greater Faridpur to Khokon Halder and Tulu Halder. At the age of 14/15, she began singing at village functions. Around 1974, she converted to Islam and took on the name Sufia Khatun. Artist Mustafa Monwar christened her "Kangalini Sufia".

Music
Sufia mostly performs with a five-member troupe that includes Baul Jahangir, Baul Mander Fakir, Pushpo (Sufia's sister), Chumki Kangalini (Sufia's granddaughter) and Bilkis Banu. She collaborated with other musicians including Kuddus Boyati, Abdur Rahman Boyati and Anusheh Anadil.

In October 2016, Sufia released her first CD album titled Ma.

Notable songs
 Poraner Bandhob Re, Buri Hoilam Tor Karone 
 Konba Pothey Nitaiganj Jai 
 Amra Nari Koto Koshto Kori 
 E Boro Ajab Kudrati 
 Buri Hoilam

Personal life
Sufia first married Sudhir Halder. Her second husband, Baul Sekom, is a Dotara player and lives in London where he works.

References

External links
 
 

Living people
1950s births
People from Faridpur District
21st-century Bangladeshi women singers
21st-century Bangladeshi singers
Bangladeshi folk singers
Bangladeshi playback singers
Date of birth missing (living people)
20th-century Bangladeshi women singers
20th-century Bangladeshi singers